Toppen Bech (born 28 March 1939) is a Norwegian journalist.

She was born in Oslo, and is the mother of Alexandra Bech Gjørv. From 1960 to 1971 she worked for the newspaper Aftenposten, and she edited the magazine Alle Kvinner from 1973 to 1978. She was assigned with the Norwegian Broadcasting Corporation from 1984. She has hosted a number of shows, including Unnskyld at jeg spør and Den blå timen. In the television series Herskapelig she presented manor houses and mansions, and a total of 62 programs were produced between 1997 and 2006.

References

1939 births
Living people
Journalists from Oslo
Norwegian magazine editors
NRK people
Aftenposten people